This is a list of presidents of the Scottish Society of the History of Medicine (SSHM).

1948-1960

1963-1980

1981-2000

2000-2019

See also
List of presidents of the British Society for the History of Medicine

References 

Lists of presidents of organizations
Presidents of the Scottish Society of the History of Medicine